The Keetmanshoop Reformed Church is a congregation of the Reformed Churches in South Africa (GKSA) in southern Namibia, headquartered in the town of Keetmanshoop but also embracing members from the towns of Aroab, Aus, Bethanie, Koës, Lüderitz, and Rosh Pinah. Since the congregation is paired with the Mariental Reformed Church, where the Rev. Johan Dunn is the current pastor since 2017, it also serves members from Mariental, Kalkrand, Maltahöhe, Stampriet, and Gochas. The collective Keetmanshoop-Mariental area is enormous, almost the size of the United Kingdom. The distance between Lüderitz and Stampriet is 500 km, and the even the distance between the two congregational seats, Keetmanshoop and Mariental, is 230 km.

Foundation 
The Keetmanshoop Reformed Church was founded in 1936 as only the fifth GKSA church in South West Africa (SWA), after the first three (Gobabis, Outjo, Aranos) were founded to serve the mostly GKSA worshipers of the Dorsland Trek exodus who had returned to SWA from Angola between 1928 and 1930. The Bitterwater Reformed Church was founded in 1935 but dissolved in 1964, leaving Keetmanshoop the fourth oldest GKSA church in the territory. Keetmanshoop was the first of these churches not connected to the Angola-Afrikaner repatriation, since most of its members were immigrants from Cape and Transvaal provinces who had settled in Keetmanshoop, Mariental, and Karasburg.

First church building: Background 
The first GKSA church building in Keetmanshoop, where the congregation worshiped from 1951 to 2001, was originally a Dutch Reformed Church in South Africa (NGK) building purchased in 1920 as the latter denomination's first church built in SWA. It was used as early as 1896 as the Krabbenhoft wagon factory. Later owned by Karel Johann Kakob Ehret and Franz August Steguweit, it became the headquarters of the painting and art dealing firm Ehret, Frey en Kie.

In 1920, the Keetmanshoop church ward council bought the building for £3,000. The Keetmanshoop Reformed Church (NGK) was founded in 1924 as a daughter church of the Mariental Reformed Church (NGK) (founded in 1898, then known as Gibeon). Before the building could be used for worship, it had to be renovated, for which Val Wurth and Metje & Ziegler won the contract. Whoever laid the keystone is forgotten. Pews were purchased from the Brothers Kappelhoff in Lüderitz.

After the founding of the NGK church, the Keetmanshoop church council decided on June 8, 1955, to expand the church hall by 30 feet. The collections flowed quickly, even in Natal, where the pastor, the Rev. H.J. Potgieter, was on sabbatical. Even the Vryheid Reformed Church (NGK), in northern Natal, contributed. The renovated church opened on February 20–21, 1926. Later, a gallery was added. After the construction of a new church for the NGK in 1945, the first Afrikaner tower church in SWA, the hall church doubled as a meeting hall, which the church council also allowed the GKSA to use for their services.

First church building purchased 
On June 10, 1950, the NGK decided to sell the old building, preferably to the local GKSA church. On September 16, 1950, the GKSA church council, after a conference, agreed to buy the building for £2,800, a bargain compared to the £3,000 the NGK had paid for it in 1920 and the improvements made to it since then. The transfer was officially made on July 21, 1951.

The Keetmanshoop GKSA church used this building until 2001. During the Rev. H.A. Louw's tenure in the 1950s, the church was renovated one more, and under the Rev. D.F. Coetzee in the 1980s, a nursery was added. In 2001, the church council sold it for N$330,000,returning it to commercial use once more.

Second church building 
The current Keetmanshoop GKSA building, purchased by the church council in 2001, was also a former NGK church, in this case the Keetmanshoop-Noord Reformed Church, spun off from the Keetmanshoop NGK church in 1958 but reabsorbed in 2000 due to the decline in both congregations' membership. It was built in the 1970s in the "tent church" style pioneered by its architect J. Anthonie Smith. The construction was contracted to the firm, K.W. Wurth, and cost R98,890. The keystone was laid on August 18, 1972, and the solemn dedication was held February 22–23, 1975.

The church's organ came from an old NGK church in Wolseley, Western Cape, also built by Smith, which had to be demolished due to damage from a September 29, 1969 earthquake. The congregation then bought the organ for R3,000 from the Keetmanshoop-Noord church, and their new church, designed by Smith, was built with its own new organ. The firm of Cooper, Gill & Tomkins, based out of Cape Town, rebuilt and modernized the older organ for R10,000.

With the reincorporation of Keetmanshoop-Noord into the Keetmanshoop NGK church, as in 1950, there was once again only one church building for the GKSA, which acquired the building for the fair price of N$300,000, less than they had paid for the old church after adjusting for inflation. The dedication of the church into the GKSA was made on November 17–18, 2001.

The Mariental Reformed Church and the Karasburg Reformed Church were both spun off from Keetmanshoop in 1966. Karasburg operated joint services with Keetmanshoop and Mariental from 1979 to 2006.

Pastors 
 Louw, Hermanus Albertus, 1958–1962
 Van der Walt, Benoni, 1963–1969
 Erasmus, Jan Carel, 1972–1974
 Van der Merwe, Dr. Sarel Jacobus, 1975–1978
 Opperman, Dr. Wilhelm Carl, 1979–1983 (together with Karasburg)
 Coetzee, Dawid Francois, 1984–1991 (together with Karasburg)
 Van der Merwe, 1991–1993 (together with Karasburg)
 Van Deventer, Hendrik Johannes Marthinus, 1994 (together with Karasburg)
 Buys, Louis Johannes, 1995–1999 (together with Karasburg)
 Fourie, Matthys Petrus, 1999–2003 (together with Karasburg)
 Venter, Maarten Petrus Albertus, 2003–2006 (together with Karasburg)
 Van Dyk, Frans Johannes, 2006 – 2017 (together with Mariental)
 Dunn, Johan, 2017 – present (together with Mariental)

Sources 
 (af) Harris, C.T., Noëth, J.G., Sarkady, N.G., Schutte, F.M. en Van Tonder, J.M. 2010. Van seringboom tot kerkgebou: die argitektoniese erfenis van die Gereformeerde Kerke. Potchefstroom: Administratiewe Buro.
 (en) Potgieter, D.J. (chief ed.) Standard Encyclopaedia of Southern Africa. Cape Town: Nasionale Opvoedkundige Uitgewery Ltd., 1973.
 (en) Raper, P.E. 1987. Dictionary of South African Place Names. Johannesburg: Lowry Publishers.
 (af) Schalekamp, Rev. M.E. (chairman: edition commission). 2001. Die Almanak van die Gereformeerde Kerke in Suid-Afrika vir die jaar 2002. Potchefstroom: Administratiewe Buro.
 (af) Van der Walt, Dr. S.J. (chairman: almanac deputies). 1997. Die Almanak van die Gereformeerde Kerke in Suid-Afrika vir die jaar 1998. Potchefstroom: Administratiewe Buro.
 (af) Venter, Rev.. A.A. (chief ed.) 1957. Almanak van die Gereformeerde Kerk in Suid-Afrika vir die jaar 1958. Potchefstroom: Administratiewe Buro.
 (af) Venter, Rev.. A.A. (chief ed.) 1958. Almanak van die Gereformeerde Kerk in Suid-Afrika vir die jaar 1959. Potchefstroom: Administratiewe Buro.
 (af) Vogel, Willem (ed.). 2014. Die Almanak van die Gereformeerde Kerke in Suid-Afrika vir die jaar 2015. Potchefstroom: Administratiewe Buro.

See also 
 Reformed Churches in Namibia

Christian denominations